Robert Charnock (or Chernock) (c. 1663 – 18 March 1696) was an English academic and Jacobite conspirator.

Life

Charnock belonged to a Warwickshire family, and was educated at Adams' Grammar School and Magdalen College, Oxford, becoming a fellow of his college and a Roman Catholic priest.

When in 1687 the dispute arose between James II of England and the fellows of Magdalen over the election of a president, Charnock favoured the first royal nominee, Anthony Farmer, and also the succeeding one, Samuel Parker, bishop of Oxford.

Almost alone among the fellows he was not driven out in November 1687, and he became dean and then vice-president of the college under the new regime, but was expelled in October 1688. Residing at the court of the Stuarts in France, or conspiring in England, Charnock and Sir George Barclay appear to have arranged the details of the unsuccessful attempt to kill William III near Turnham Green in February 1696. It was Charnock whom the Jacobites deputed to go see King James and ask for 10,000 French troops. This was refused as the troops were needed by the French on account of tensions with William III in the Low Countries. Barclay escaped, but Charnock was arrested, tried and found guilty, and hanged on 18 March 1696.

The Tower of London Armoury in the White Tower has a blunderbuss labelled as belonging to Robert Charnock with which he intended to shoot King William III.

References

1660s births
English criminals
People from Warwick
1696 deaths
People educated at Adams' Grammar School
English Jacobites
Executed people from Warwickshire
People executed by Stuart England